F.I.R No. 339/07/06 is a 2021 Indian Bengali-language crime thriller film written and directed by Joydip Mukherjee. The film stars Ankush Hazra, Ritabhari Chakraborty, Bonny Sengupta, Falaque Rashid Roy and Shantilal Mukherjee in the lead roles. The film was released on 10 October 2021 coinciding with the Puja holidays. The film premiered on ZEE5 on 22 October 2021, 12 days after the release.

Plot
Lalbazar crime branch assigned Abhrajit Dutta to solve a series of murder mystery in Raghunathpur village, Birbhum district. Abhrajit realises that local police officials are also involves with crimes. A gangster Mishra uses young bloods for his illegal business like smugling, immoral trafficking and extortion. Abhrajit befriended with doctor Esha and sub inspector Naren. He decides not to leave the village without solving the murder case.

Cast
 Ankush Hazra as ACP Abhrajit Dutta, Lalbazar Crime Branch
 Ritabhari Chakraborty as Dr. Esha Chakraborty
 Bonny Sengupta as SI Naren Basak
 Falaque Rashid Roy as Shiuli
 Shantilal Mukherjee as Bhagirath Mishra, a local gangster
 Priyanka Bhattacharya as Diya. 
 Sucharita Mukherjee as Esha's mother
 Anirban Chakrabarti as Inspector Paritosh Bairagi

Soundtrack

Production
The list of actors and actresses of the film was released from the producer(s). That list shows that Ankush Hazra, Ritabhari Chakraborty, Bonny Sengupta, Falaque Rashid Roy, Anirban Chakrabarti and Shantilal Mukherjee are acting in the film.

Award
 West Bengal Film Journalists' Association Awards- Best Performance In A Negative Role- Anirban Chakrabarti (Won)

References

2021 films
2021 crime thriller films
Bengali-language Indian films
2020s Bengali-language films
Films postponed due to the COVID-19 pandemic
Film productions suspended due to the COVID-19 pandemic

External links